Strandby is a village in western Himmerland with a population of 268 (1. January 2022). Strandby is located near Ertebølle between Risgårde Bredning in Limfjorden one kilometer west and Farsø nine kilometers to the east.

The village is located in the North Jutland region and belongs to Vesthimmerland Municipality. Strandby is located in Strandby parish.

Strandby Church is located in the village.

References

Towns and settlements in Vesthimmerland Municipality
Geography of Denmark